The rainbow gudgeon (Sarcocheilichthys nigripinnis) is a species of cyprinid fish found in China, Taiwan, and the Korean peninsula.

References

Sarcocheilichthys
Taxa named by Albert Günther
Fish described in 1873